Debora Pixner  (born 24 September 1992) is an Italian freestyle skier. She competed in the 2018 Winter Olympics, in ski cross.

References

External links

1992 births
Living people
Italian female freestyle skiers
Olympic freestyle skiers of Italy 
Freestyle skiers at the 2018 Winter Olympics 
Sportspeople from Merano
Germanophone Italian people
21st-century Italian women